William Riley Jackson (April 4, 1881 in Pittsburgh, Pennsylvania – September 24, 1958 in Peoria, Illinois) was a first baseman for the Chicago Whales baseball team in 1914 and 1915. He managed in the minor leagues for a number of teams between 1917 and 1925.

External links

1881 births
1958 deaths
Baseball players from Pittsburgh
Major League Baseball first basemen
Chicago Whales players
Sportspeople from Peoria, Illinois
Baseball players from Illinois
Greenville Hunters players
Waco Navigators players
Dallas Giants players
Houston Buffaloes players
Portsmouth Cobblers players
Portsmouth Truckers players
Petersburg Goobers players
Oklahoma City Indians players
Seattle Giants players
San Francisco Seals (baseball) players
Peoria Distillers players
South Bend Benders players
Omaha Rourkes players
Peoria Tractors players
Minor league baseball managers